Becontree was an ancient hundred in the south west of the county of Essex, England. Its area has been entirely absorbed by the growth of London; with its name reused in 1921 for the large Becontree estate of the London County Council. Its former area now corresponds to the London Borough of Newham, the London Borough of Barking and Dagenham and parts of the London Borough of Waltham Forest and the London Borough of Redbridge. Its early extent also included parts of what is now the London Borough of Havering.<ref name=becontree_victoria>The hundred of Becontree: Introduction', A History of the County of Essex: Volume 5 (1966). Date accessed: 11 January 2008.</ref>

History

The name is first recorded in the 1086 Domesday Book as Beuentreu, meaning tree of a man called Beohha. The original tree, at Becontree Heath, was the location that early hundred meetings took place. Before 1465 it included the area of Havering liberty, which comprised the parishes of Hornchurch, Romford and Havering-atte-Bower, and thus the hundred meeting place was not originally located on the fringe of the area. After the area of the liberty was removed, the hundred contained the parishes of Barking, Dagenham, East Ham, Ilford (also known as Great Ilford), Leyton, Little Ilford, Walthamstow, Wanstead and West Ham.

The southern boundary with the Blackheath hundred of Kent was the River Thames, however there was also a land boundary; the Woolwich parish included two small detached parts north of the river, totalling . In the east it bordered the Havering liberty and to the north Waltham and Ongar hundreds. The River Lea formed the western boundary with the Tower division of the Ossulstone hundred of Middlesex. The River Roding runs roughly north to south through the area.

In 1831, the hundred occupied . In 1840 the hundred was included in the Metropolitan Police District by the Metropolitan Police Act 1839. The population of the hundred in 1851 was 46,777 and in 1861, 73,023.

Replacement

The hundreds of England declined in administrative use because of the rise of various ad hoc'' boards. By 1894 they were effectively replaced by a system of uniform local government districts, which were consolidated over time and finally replaced in 1965 by the London boroughs which are still in use.

References

See also
Hundreds of Essex

History of the London Borough of Newham
History of the London Borough of Redbridge
History of the London Borough of Barking and Dagenham
History of the London Borough of Waltham Forest
History of local government in London (pre-1855)
Hundreds of Essex